Nong Kathao is a subdistrict in the Nakhon Thai District of Phitsanulok Province, Thailand.

Geography
Nong Kathao is bordered to the north by Tha Sakae, to the east by Noen Phoem, to the south by Huai Hia and to the west by Kaeng Sopha.

Nong Kathao lies in the Nan Basin, which is part of the Chao Phraya Watershed.

Administration
The following is a list of the subdistrict's mubans (villages):

Points of interest
The following points of interest are located within the subdistrict:
 Ruins of an ancient temple ป่าแดงเขาวัด
 Huai Roo Lake
 Nakhon Thai Office of Primary Education
 Nakhon Thai Department of Public Health
 Phitsanulok Animal Species Conservation Center

References

Tambon of Phitsanulok province
Populated places in Phitsanulok province